The Polish zone in Iraq (Polish: Polska strefa w Iraku), designated as the South Central, South Center, Central South, Center South Zone or Sector (Polish: Strefa środkowo-południowa), was the area of responsibility for Multinational Division Central-South under Polish command, during the Occupation of Iraq. It was created in 2003 when Iraq was divided into four zones. The occupation ended on 31 December 2008.

The South Central Zone covered the Al-Qādisiyyah, Karbala, Babil and the Wasit Governorates. The region had a population of about 5 million spread over 65,632 km2. The Najaf Governorate was passed back to American control in 2004, due to reduction in strength of the forces under Polish command; this reduced the zone to about 3 million of population spread over 28,655 km2. Major cities in the Polish zone include Diwaniyah, Kut, Hillah, and Karbala and Najaf. The strength of the Polish forces decreased from 2,500 (2003) to 900 (2007); the Multinational Division Central-South numbers about 2,000 troops. Polish casualties number was 25. The casualties of the entire division were 65.

See also
Polish involvement in the 2003 invasion of Iraq

References 

Military history of Poland
Multinational force involved in the Iraq War
History of Poland (1989–present)
States and territories established in 2003
States and territories disestablished in 2008
Military occupation